Khintida is a rural locality (a selo) in Shidibsky Selsoviet, Tlyaratinsky District, Republic of Dagestan, Russia. The population was 58 as of 2010.

Geography 
Khintida is located 20 km northwest of Tlyarata (the district's administrative centre) by road. Landa is the nearest rural locality.

References 

Rural localities in Tlyaratinsky District